Mark Allen Slaughter (born July 4, 1964) is an American singer and musician, and one of the founders of the glam metal band Slaughter.

Career 
Slaughter was born in Las Vegas, Nevada, on July 4, 1964. Before the formation of Slaughter, he fronted Xcursion, a Las Vegas-based metal band while attending Chaparral High School before joining the Vinnie Vincent Invasion, who had a hit song, "Love Kills", that appeared on the A Nightmare on Elm Street 4: The Dream Master movie soundtrack in 1988. After that band disbanded in the late 1980s, two of its members, Slaughter and Dana Strum, formed the group Slaughter.

Slaughter sold more than five million records in the 1990s. The group had four Top 30 hits on the Billboard charts with tunes such as "Fly to the Angels" and "Up All Night", and toured with bands such as Kiss, Poison, Ozzy Osbourne and Damn Yankees.

Slaughter actively participates in charity work with St. Jude Children's Hospital.

In January 2015, Slaughter digitally released a solo album titled Reflections in a Rear View Mirror. The album was released worldwide and became available in CD format on May 22, 2015.

In May 2017, Slaughter's second solo record, Halfway There, was released via EMP Label Group.

Halfway There 
In April 2017, Slaughter announced that he had signed to EMP Label Group, and would release his second solo album Halfway There in May of that year.

References

External links 

Official website
Mark Slaughter Interview – NAMM Oral History Library (2016)

1964 births
Living people
American male composers
20th-century American composers
American heavy metal guitarists
American male singers
Glam metal musicians
People from the Las Vegas Valley
Rhythm guitarists
Slaughter (band) members
Songwriters from Nevada
Vinnie Vincent Invasion members
Guitarists from Nevada
20th-century American guitarists
American male guitarists